Roberto Bryan Reyna Casaverde (23 August 1998), who prefers to be known as Bryan Reyna, is a Peruvian football player who plays as a midfielder and attacker for Liga 1 club Academia Cantolao.

Club career

Early career
Born in Lima and raised in Callao's Ventanilla District, Reyna first began by playing in the youth divisions of Sport Boys in 2013, then he joined to Academia Deportiva Cantolao. In 2015, he went on a trials with the Argentine club Lanús and later with the Spanish side RCD Mallorca, Both teams showed interest in having him but finally he decided to accept the RCD Mallorca's offer.

RCD Mallorca
Reyna joined RCD Mallorca in June 2016 but due to document issues he had to wait until February 2017 to sign a two-year contract. He played with RCD Mallorca youth team in the División de Honor Juvenil de Fútbol during the second half of the 2016–17 season.

In July 2017 he was part of RCD Mallorca first team's pre-season under the orders of coach Vicente Moreno playing several friendly matches and even scoring a goal. Reyna made his official debut with RCD Mallorca in a 1–0 away win against CF Peralada on 20 August 2017 and completed a total of 11 appearances until the winter break of the 2017–18 Segunda División B.

On 3 October 2017, Mallorca announced a contract extension with Reyna until 30 June 2021.

Loans to Toledo, Alcoyano, Barakaldo and Las Rozas
In January 2018 he was loaned to Toledo until the end of the 2017–18 season.

In July 2018 he joined to Alcoyano, also on loan from Mallorca, for all the 2018–19 season. In this season he went on to make thirty appearances with his side in the Segunda División B.

The beginning of the 2019–20 season saw Reyna go on loan to Barakaldo, in principle, for the entire season. However, the loan was interrupted during the winter break at the request of the footballer himself due to the few minutes played with Barakaldo. He was then loaned by Mallorca to Las Rozas for the rest of the 2019–20 season. Reyna scored his first official goals with these two teams, the first one with Barakaldo against Calahorra on 20 October 2019 and the second with Las Rozas against Celta de Vigo B on 25 January 2020.

Return to RCD Mallorca (B) and departure
Reyna returned to RCD Mallorca for the 2020–21 season. He participated in the first team's pre-season and played a friendly match under the orders of coach Luis García Plaza. However, he ended up being sent to the RCD Mallorca B, the RCD Mallorca's reserve team.

In January 2021, Reyna was sacked from RCD Mallorca after he was intervened for breaching the curfew that was in force in Spain during the COVID-19 pandemic.

Return to Academia Cantolao
In March 2021, Reyna signed a three-years contract deal with his home club Academia Cantolao, which had been playing in the Peruvian Primera División for 4 years since its promotion in 2016, He made twenty–one appearances and scored three goals during the 2021 season. In the 2022 season, he made 28 appearances and scored 6 goals.

International career

Youth teams
During his stay at Academia Cantolao in 2014, Reyna was observed by the coach of Peru U17 at the time, Juan José Oré, in order to integrate him into the team that was preparing for the 2015 South American U-17 Championship. Eventually, Reyna was part of Peru's U17 squad in that tournament held in Paraguay in March 2015.

He was also part of Peru U20 squad in the 2017 South American U-20 Championship that took place in Ecuador in January and February 2017.

Senior team
Reyna was included in a Peru national team's alternative list by the coach Juan Reynoso on 9 September 2022. However, he was called-up to the main squad officially on 17 September 2022 to replace Andy Polo who had been dismissed due to an injury.

He made his international debut in a friendly match against El Salvador on 27 September 2022. He also scored his first international goal in the 81st minute of this match which ended with a 4–1 victory for Peru.

References

External links
 FootManagerScout ID 77050892
 Bryan Reyna Fmdataba profile
 
 
 
 

1998 births
Living people
People from Lima
Peruvian footballers
Association football wingers
Segunda División players
Segunda División B players
RCD Mallorca B players
RCD Mallorca players
Academia Deportiva Cantolao players
Expatriate footballers in Spain
Peru international footballers